The Middle East Monitor (MEMO) is a not-for-profit press monitoring organisation and lobbying group that emerged in mid 2009. MEMO is largely focused on the Israeli–Palestinian conflict, but writes about other issues in the Middle East as well. MEMO is pro-Palestinian in orientation and supports Islamist causes. MEMO is regarded as an outlet for the Muslim Brotherhood and its website strongly promotes pro-Hamas related content. 

MEMO is financed by the State of Qatar. Daud Abdullah, former assistant secretary general of the Muslim Council of Britain, serves as the director of the organization.

Events
In June 2011, MEMO organized a speaking tour for Raed Salah, leader of the northern branch of the Islamic Movement in Israel. Salah, who was banned from entering the UK by the home secretary, was held in custody pending deportation until April 2012 when an immigration tribunal ruled that the home secretary had been misled.

In 2011, MEMO co-organized an event with Amnesty International and Palestine Solidarity Campaign titled "Complicity in oppression: Do the media aid Israel?" featuring Abdel Bari Atwan.

On 22 August 2015, MEMO organized an event titled "Palestine & Latin America: Building solidarity for national rights", featuring alleged antisemitic cartoonist Carlos Latuff and British Palestinian activist Azzam Tamimi. Jeremy Corbyn was scheduled to appear as well, but pulled out.

In November 2017, MEMO organized an event titled "Crisis in Saudi Arabia: War, Succession and the Future" discussion Saudi Arabia's future monarchy succession and regional rivalries with Iran and war in Yemen.

Staff
The staff and contributors of MEMO include Daud Abdullah, Ibrahim Hewitt and Ben White

Criticism
According to Ehud Rosen, author of a 2010 report for the Jerusalem Center for Public Affairs where he is a senior researcher, MEMO generally supports Islamist positions within Palestinian politics and that although it shares platforms with Muslim Brotherhood-affiliates and Islamist supporters, "it seems to have reached the level of more respected institutions such as, for example, Chatham House". 

In 2011, John Ware of BBC News described MEMO as a pro-Hamas publication.

Haaretz reporter Anshel Pfeffer described MEMO in 2015 as a "conspiracy theory-peddling anti-Israel organisation" and in the same year, MEMO was described by Dave Rich as promoting conspiracy theories about "Jews, Zionists, money and power." and said that MEMO had "questioned the suitability of Matthew Gould for the post of UK ambassador to Israel simply because he was Jewish".

Writing in 2016, Yiftah Curiel, an employee of the Israeli Ministry of Foreign Affairs, wrote that some of the staff of MEMO as well as the similar Middle East Eye are also active in Interpal, which has been designated in Israel as a terror-supporting group, as well as being on the United States Treasury's list of specially-designated terrorist organisations. The site itself is sympathetic to Hamas, and the Hamas website and social media accounts post and share material from the Middle East Monitor.

References

External links
 Official website
 Spanish edition

Communications and media organisations based in the United Kingdom
Media coverage of the Arab–Israeli conflict
Mass media in the Middle East
2009 establishments in the United Kingdom
Internet properties established in 2009
News websites
British news websites
Multilingual websites